Tampico is an unincorporated community in Valley County, Montana, United States, located between Glasgow and Hinsdale. It is one of many communities that was created as a stopping point for the railroad.

References

Unincorporated communities in Valley County, Montana
Unincorporated communities in Montana